Gucheng Station is a station on Line 1 of the Beijing Subway. It is situated in Shijingshan District. This station currently serves as the terminus of the line from 18 April 2020 until late 2023, due to station upgrades at Pingguoyuan.

The station used to be known as Guchenglu Station.

Station Layout 
The station has two side platforms.

Exits 
There are four exits: lettered A, B, C, and D. Exit D is accessible.

Gallery

References

External links

Beijing Subway stations in Shijingshan District
Railway stations in China opened in 1971